Mount Marami, or Mataas na Gulod Boulders, is a cliff at the southern portion of Mount Mataas na Gulod in Cavite province on the island of Luzon, Philippines.

History
The rock pillars feature was once called as Nagbuo by the locals. And as soon as mountaineers frequented the area, it was called Marami (en. plenty) as referencing to its feature having multiple rocky pillars.

Hiking activity

Mount Marami can be climbed from Barangay Ramirez of Magallanes, Cavite to where the trail ends at its summit where the Silyang Bato, a rock formation which means Stone Chair, can be climbed for a 360-degree view of the Mounts Palay-Palay–Mataas-na-Gulod Protected Landscape.

A trail traversing all the mountains of the protected landscape starting at the foot of Marami and ends at Palay-Palay in Nasugbu was mapped by a five-man expedition team in 2014.

See also
 List of mountains in the Philippines
 List of national parks of the Philippines

References

Mountains of the Philippines
Landforms of Cavite
Landforms of Batangas